The Ada Foah Wave Farm is Africa's first wave farm commissioned in Ada Foah, Ghana. The  wave farm pilot project was developed by Swedish company Seabased.

See also 
 List of power stations in Ghana
 List of wave power stations

References 

Wave farms in Ghana